Fetlework Gebregziabher (nom de guerre Monjorino; born ), is an Ethiopian politician and current Vice President of the Tigray Region and deputy chair of Tigray People's Liberation Front (TPLF). Fetlework was the Ethiopian Minister of Trade and Industry from October 2018 to January 2020.

Early life
Fetlework joined the Tigray People's Liberation Front (TPLF) in 1979. She obtained her Master's degree at the London School of Economics (LSE) in the early 2000s.

Politics
After joining the TPLF in her childhood and studying at the LSE against the wishes of the TPLF leaders, Fetlework was elected to the TPLF Central Committee in 2006 and in 2010. She was elected as a member of the TPLF Executive Committee in 2015 and appointed to other senior TPLF positions during 2015–2017. In November 2017, Fetlework was elected as deputy Chair of the TPLF, as the first woman to hold the position, and reelected in October 2018.

Minister
In Ethiopian prime minister Abiy Ahmed's October 2018 cabinet reshuffle, Fetlework was appointed Minister of Trade and Industry. She was replaced by Melaku Alebel in January 2020. Fetlework stated that she had not received any negative performance evaluations from either Abiy or the Cabinet. She interpreted her replacement as being motivated by the TPLF's refusal to join the Prosperity Party.

References

1960s births
Living people
Alumni of the London School of Economics
Tigray People's Liberation Front politicians
Women government ministers of Ethiopia
Government ministers of Ethiopia
21st-century Ethiopian politicians
21st-century Ethiopian women politicians